Rasel may refer to:

Rasel (singer), (born Rafael Abad Anselmo), Spanish singer
Rasel (actor), Bangladeshi film actor
Syed Rasel, Bangladeshi cricketer